The 58th Street Terminal or 58th Street station was a station on the demolished IRT Sixth Avenue Line in Manhattan, New York City. It had three tracks and two side platforms. The center track was used for storage. The station was opened by the Gilbert Elevated Railway on June 5, 1878, and served as the northern terminus of the IRT Sixth Avenue Line trains until the line was acquired by the Manhattan Railway Company and built a connecting spur from 50th Street Station (the next southbound stop) along 53rd Street to the Ninth Avenue Elevated. It was replaced as the northernmost station on the line by the Eighth Avenue station in 1881, and closed on June 16, 1924.

Though there are no longer any New York City Subway stations explicitly named 58th Street, the area is now served by the underground 57th Street subway station, one block to the south of the former 58th Street Terminal.

References

IRT Sixth Avenue Line stations
Railway stations in the United States opened in 1878
Railway stations closed in 1924
Former elevated and subway stations in Manhattan
1924 disestablishments in New York (state)
1878 establishments in New York (state)